These are the Billboard magazine number-one albums of 1974, per the Billboard 200.

Elton John's Goodbye Yellow Brick Road was the best performing album of 1974 despite not reaching number one at any point during the year. The album achieved 8 weeks atop the chart during 1973.

Chart history

See also
1974 in music
List of number-one albums (United States)

References

1974
1974 record charts